The Mascarene paradise flycatcher (Terpsiphone bourbonnensis) is a species of bird in the monarch-flycatcher family Monarchidae. It is endemic to the Mascarene islands of Mauritius and Réunion. There are two subspecies recognized: the nominate subspecies from Réunion, also known as the Réunion paradise flycatcher; and T. b. desolata (Salomonsen, 1933) from Mauritius. The Mascarene paradise flycatcher was originally described in the genus Muscicapa and the subspecies T. b. desolata  was originally described as a separate species.

Description
The Mascarene paradise flycatcher lacks the long tail shared by many members of the paradise flycatcher genus Terpsiphone, and measures  in length. The male has a black head with a grey neck-band, throat, breast and belly. The upperparts and tail are chestnut, and the wings are tipped black. The bill is bright blue, and the legs greyish. The female is smaller than the male, with a paler bill and a dark-grey head. The subspecies T. b. desolata is larger than the nominate and has brighter plumage.

Habitat
The habitat requirements of this species vary by subspecies. T. b. desolata is mostly restricted to native evergreen and some plantations of Araucaria cunninghamii and A. columnaris. Its preferred habitat seems to be a closed canopy with still air but not too much undergrowth.

Behaviour

Diet and feeding
The Mascarene paradise flycatcher feeds on a range of insects, including beetles, flies, dragonflies, moths, grasshoppers, and mayflies. Prey is obtained by watching from a perch and then hawking from the air or sally-gleaning off vegetation. It may also glean insects off vegetation while perched. They usually feed alone, but may join flocks of white-eyes; this behaviour is more common on Réunion than Mauritius.

Breeding
Breeding is seasonal, from August to February on Mauritius and September to December on Réunion. The nest is a cone-shaped cup of moss, lichen and spiderweb. Two to three creamy or pink-white eggs, with rusty spots are laid and then incubated by both parents for 14–16 days. Chicks are fed for five weeks after hatching and remain in their parent's territory for 8–9 weeks after fledging.

References

Terpsiphone
Birds of Mauritius
Birds described in 1776
Birds of Réunion
Taxonomy articles created by Polbot